Back in Blood may refer to:
Back in Blood (The 69 Eyes album)
Back in Blood (Debauchery album)
"Back in Blood" (song), by Pooh Shiesty from the mixtape Shiesty Season